The Pantai Dalam Komuter station is a KTM Komuter train station in Pantai Dalam, Lembah Pantai, Kuala Lumpur, Malaysia and served by the Port Klang Line. The station is built to cater the traffic in Pantai Dalam, as well as the northern parts of Jalan Klang Lama (i.e. Taman Desa, Scott Garden, Kuchai Lama).

The Pantai Dalam station usually busy during rush hours, public holidays and weekends as it is used by worker to reach offices.

Name
Pantai Dalam station was simply Pantai station in the 1980s before taking its current name, Pantai Dalam.

Gallery

References

External links

Pantai Dalam KTM Komuter Station

Railway stations in Kuala Lumpur
Port Klang Line